Lieutenant Colonel Gustaf Arthur Aspelin (2 February 1868 - 22 September 1949) was an officer in the Military of the Grand Duchy of Finland, in the Imperial Russian Army and in the Finnish Defence Forces, a lawyer and a politician. 

Aspelin was born, in Lestijärvi. He was a member of the Parliament of Finland from 1922 to 1924, representing the National Progressive Party.

References

1868 births
1949 deaths
People from Lestijärvi
People from Vaasa Province (Grand Duchy of Finland)
National Progressive Party (Finland) politicians
Members of the Parliament of Finland (1922–24)
Imperial Russian Army officers
Finnish officers
University of Helsinki alumni
Finnish people from the Russian Empire